Council of the Republic of the National Assembly of the Republic of Belarus of the 7th convocation —is the current convocation of the upper house of the Belarusian Parliament, elected in indirect elections by the regional Councils of Deputies on 7 November 2019.

On 12 November 2019, at a meeting of the Central Commission of the Republic of Belarus for elections and holding republican referendums, the results of the elections of members of the Council of the Republic of the National Assembly of the Republic of Belarus of the seventh convocation were established. Eight members of the Council of the Republic were elected from each region, the city of Minsk, and 4 more members were appointed by the President of the Republic of Belarus. A total of 60 members of the Council of the Republic were elected.

Formation procedure 

The Council of the Republic is the chamber of territorial representation. In accordance with part two of Article 91 of the Constitution of the Republic of Belarus, eight members of the Council of the Republic are elected from each region and the city of Minsk by secret ballot at meetings of deputies of local Councils, deputies of the base level of each region and the city of Minsk. Eight members of the Council of the Republic are appointed by the President of the Republic of Belarus.

In accordance with the Constitution of the Republic of Belarus, elections of a new composition of the Council of the Republic are appointed by the President of the Republic of Belarus no later than four months and are held no later than 30 days before the end of the powers of the Council of the Republic of the current convocation. Extraordinary elections of the Council of the Republic are held within three months from the date of early termination of its powers.

A citizen of the Republic of Belarus who has reached the age of 30 and has lived in the territory of the relevant region, the city of Minsk for at least five years may be a member of the Council of the Republic. A member of the Council of the Republic cannot be a member of the House of Representatives or a member of the Government at the same time; it is not allowed to combine the duties of a member of the Council of the Republic with the simultaneous holding of the position of the President of the Republic of Belarus or a judge.

The first session of the Council of the Republic after the elections is convened by the Central Commission for Elections and Republican Referendums and begins its work no later than 30 days after the elections.

Composition

Leadership 

 Natalya Kochanova — Chairwoman of the Council of the Republic of the National Assembly of the Republic of Belarus
 Anatoly Isachenko — Deputy Chairman of the Council of the Republic of the National Assembly of the Republic of Belarus.

Presidium of the Council of the Republic 

 Viktor Liskovich — Chairman of the Standing Commission of the Council of the Republic of the National Assembly of the Republic of Belarus on Education, Science, Culture and Social Development
 Sergey Rachkov — Chairman of the Standing Committee of the Council of the Republic of the National Assembly of the Republic of Belarus on International Affairs and National Security
 Tatyana Runets — Chairwoman of the Standing Commission of the Council of the Republic of the National Assembly of the Republic of Belarus on Economy, Budget and Finance
 Mikhail Rusy — Chairman of the Standing Commission of the Council of the Republic of the National Assembly of the Republic of Belarus on Regional Policy and Local Self-Government
 Sergey Sivets — Chairman of the Standing Committee of the Council of the Republic of the National Assembly of the Republic of Belarus on Legislation and State Building.

Composition 
The Council of the Republic of the National Assembly of the Republic of Belarus of the 7th convocation consists of the following members:

See also 

 7th House of Representatives of Belarus

References 

Members of the Council of the Republic of Belarus
Council of the Republic of Belarus